Emmanuel Kwihangana is an air force engineer currently appointed as the acting chief of air staff of the Uganda Air Force, replaced Major General James Birungi. He previously held a position as a director in Engineering department of the Ugandan People's Defence Forces Air Force. 

Colonel Emmanuel is an engineer by profession and had held various positions such includes; Director Operations, director of Engineering and director Personnel and Administration in the air force before being the acting chief of air staff.

Notes 

Ugandan military personnel
Ugandan Christians
Living people
Year of birth missing (living people)